Leonardo Ferreira da Silva (born 19 July 1980), sometimes known as just Leo, is a Brazilian football striker who previously played for HamKam in Norway, and was released by South China in May 2010. He joined Yangon United FC in July 2010.

Honours
South China AA
Hong Kong First Division League: 1
 2009–10
Hong Kong Senior Challenge Shield: 1
 2009–10

External links
 

1980 births
Living people
Sportspeople from Campinas
Brazilian footballers
Brazilian expatriate footballers
SC Rheindorf Altach players
Hamarkameratene players
South China AA players
Brazilian expatriate sportspeople in Hong Kong
Expatriate footballers in Poland
Expatriate footballers in Thailand
Austrian Football Bundesliga players
Eliteserien players
Hong Kong First Division League players
Expatriate footballers in Austria
Expatriate footballers in Norway
Expatriate footballers in Hong Kong
Brazilian expatriate sportspeople in Austria
Expatriate footballers in Myanmar
Expatriate footballers in Egypt
Association football forwards